William Ashton Switzer (born March 28, 1984) is an American-Canadian voice, film, and television actor. He is known for his work on the animated television series Mummies Alive! He had a leading role in Eerie, Indiana: The Other Dimension and he also performed in Sabrina: The Animated Series. While he has voiced several roles in anime, he was also Philthy from MythQuest and the voice of Harvey Kinkle from Sabrina: The Animated Series and Sam "Cannonball" Guthrie from X-Men: Evolution. He also voiced Billy's former friend Nick in the second season of Billy the Cat which he took over from Lee Tockar who also wrote one episode of the show.

Career 
Switzer attended his first audition and won his first role, in a Shari Lewis special, when he was a teenager. He voices the lead character; Presley Carnavon in the television show Mummies Alive!

Switzer was nominated for a Young Artist Award for The Christmas List (1997).

Switzer was noticed for his starring role in Mr. Rice's Secret (2000), in which he played a young cancer patient.  He was in almost every scene of the film. Elvis Mitchell of the New York Times wrote, "In the leading role, Mr. Switzer is fine as Owen, especially given that he has to spend a great deal of time talking to himself". The Vancouver Province wrote, "[T]here's an appealing freshness to the young cast of this Vancouver-filmed movie, especially Switzer in the lead role".

He had a leading role in the television show Eerie, Indiana: The Other Dimension.

Switzer was reported to be directing a short film at age 17.

Personal life 
Switzer, who lived in Tsawwassen at the time Mr. Rice's Secret was in production, was reported to be a good swimmer and baseball player in his youth. He learned to ride a horse for his guest role in The Adventures of Shirley Holmes.

Selected filmography

Film
 Mail to the Chief - Kenny Witkowski
 Cheats - Garret
 The Dinosaur Hunter - Daniel
 When Danger Follows You Home - Andrew Werden
 Locked in Silence - John
 The Right Connections - Gary Fleming
 The Christmas List - Danny Skyler
 A Call to Remember - Sandy Halper
 The Life - Jason
 Mr. Rice's Secret - Owen Walters
 Death Note - Sasaki (voice)

Television
 The Adventures of Shirley Holmes - Matt
 Cold Squad - Stewart
 Dead Man's Gun - JoJo
 The Dead Zone - Doug Hirsh
 Eerie, Indiana: The Other Dimension - Mitchell Taylor
 First Wave - Nick Patterson
 MythQuest - Philthy
 The Sentinel - Edward Lazar

Anime roles
 Mobile Suit Gundam SEED - Sai Argyle
 Mobile Suit Gundam: Char's Counterattack - Hathaway Noah
 Zoids: New Century Zero - Jamie Hemeros, Lineback
 Cardcaptors - Eli Moon
 MegaMan NT Warrior - Chaud Blaze
 Infinite Ryvius - Ikumi Oze
 Ranma ½ - Harumaki's Grandson
 Master Keaton - Shinsuke Yunase
 Dragon Drive - Ichiro Sumishiba
 Trouble Chocolate - Boy with Card, Raisin
 Boys Over Flowers - Junpei Oribe

Voice Work
 Billy the Cat - Nick (Season 2)
 Extreme Dinosaurs - Additional Voices
 Greatest Heroes and Legends of the Bible - Various characters
 Mama, Do You Love Me? - Sam and Rascal
 Milo's Bug Quest
 Mummies Alive! - Presley Carnavon
 Rainbow Fish - Stingo
 Sabrina: The Animated Series - Harvey Kinkle
 Silverwing - Shade
 X-Men: Evolution - Sam "Cannonball" Guthrie

Video Games
 Mobile Suit Gundam: Encounters in Space - Kou Uraki

References

External links
 

1984 births
Canadian male child actors
Canadian male film actors
Canadian male television actors
Canadian male voice actors
Living people
Male actors from Houston
Male actors from Vancouver